John Barry Willett is an emeritus professor at Harvard University Graduate School of Education and a member of the National Academy of Education who specialized in the teaching, development and application of innovative quantitative methods in the social sciences.

Willett was born in 1947 in the city of Leeds, in the county of Yorkshire, England, and raised from the age of 10 in the nearby town of Harrogate, . In Harrogate, he attended Woodlands Elementary School and completed his secondary education at Harrogate Grammar School, eventually serving as Head Boy and Captain of the Rugby Team.  Subsequently, he received an Open Venning Exhibition to study physics, specializing in quantum mechanics, at Worcester College, Oxford University.  He went up to Oxford in 1967, graduating with a degree in physics in 1970.  In 1971, after a further year of study at Oxford, he earned a certificate in education, becoming officially certified as a teacher of physics and mathematics.  Then, briefly, in 1970, after a decade of playing acoustic folk and blues in various amateur bands and clubs in both Yorkshire and Oxford, Willett became a professional musician, playing bass guitar in the short-lived rock n'roll band, e. Bo Jobb, based in Bradford, in the North of England.

In 1972, Willett moved with his wife to Hong Kong where he taught high-school physics and mathematics at Hong Kong's Island School until 1978, and also served as Housemaster of the Da Vinci House.  Then, from 1978 through 1980, he became a Teaching Consultant in the School of Education at Hong Kong University, where he worked with in-service teachers of physics in schools throughout Hong Kong and Kowloon.  While working at HKU, Willett earned an advanced diploma in education and a master's degree in psychometric and research methods.  In addition, while living in Hong Kong, Willett authored a comprehensive physics textbook for students in Hong Kong schools, entitled A New School Physics for Hong Kong, which was published by Ling Kee Press.  He also hosted a popular weekly TV science-magazine show, Tomorrow's World, each Sunday evening, on Hong Kong's TVB Pearl, the show being sponsored by the Hong Kong & Shanghai Banking Corporation.

Willett moved to the USA in 1980, with his wife and daughter, in order to attend graduate school at Stanford University where he earned a master's degree in statistics and a doctorate in applied quantitative methods, graduating with the latter in 1985.

In 1985, Willett joined the faculty of the Harvard University Graduate School of Education, eventually rising to the position of full professor, and holding the title of Charles William Eliot Professor of Education. He went on to serve as Academic Dean of the School of Education for two years, under Dean Jerry Murphy, and then became Acting Dean in Murphy's place for one year under President Larry Summers, serving in both positions jointly with his colleague and collaborator Judith D. Singer.  During his career, Willett received the Palmer O. Johnson Memorial Award (in 1988), the Raymond B. Cattell Early Career Award for Programmatic Research (in 1992) and the Research Review Award (1991), by the American Educational Research Association.  In 2006, he received the Morningstar Family Award for Excellence in Teaching from the Harvard Graduate School of Education.  He was elected a member of the National Academy of Education in 2004.

Willett is an expert in the application of innovative statistical methods for the analysis of longitudinal data and in quantitative methods for making causal inferences from data, in education and the social sciences.  During his academic career, both individually and in collaboration with colleagues, he wrote five books and more than 130 peer-reviewed academic papers.  He also taught popular courses in applied quantitative methods to more than 3,000 graduate students from departments throughout Harvard University and the Massachusetts Institute of Technology.  These included courses on applied data analysis, covariance structure analysis, applied longitudinal data analysis, research design and causal inference.

In 1990, under the auspices of the Harvard Seminar on Assessment—along with his colleagues Judith D. Singer and Richard J. Light—Willett authored the book By Design: Planning Research on Higher Education.  The Harvard Assessment Seminar was established by Harvard President Derek Bok, in the late 1980s, to identify, address and offer solutions to the topical issue of systematic assessment in higher education.  It was organized and chaired by Professor Richard J. Light and attended regularly by more than 100 university faculty and administrators from twenty universities around the USA, and by representatives of selected State and Federal Agencies.  "By Design" was the authors' contribution to the seminar's purpose.  The book was written to facilitate the conduct of superior research in higher education and was dedicated specifically to the proposition that "you can't fix by analysis, what you bungled by design."  That is, it doesn't matter how much data you collect and how good you are at analysis, if you didn't get the research design and data-collection right at the start!  To support their thesis, the authors presented, and dissected, many concrete examples of excellent prior research projects in higher education and laid out a systematic framework for designing new research that was more effective.

In 1991, Willett and his collaborators Richard J. Murnane, Judith D. Singer, James J. Kemple and Randall J. Olsen published a comprehensive portrait of the careers of more than 50,000 teachers who were serving in America's public schools, based on extensive discrete-time survival analyses of their longitudinal teaching records.  The book was titled Who Will Teach? and was published by Harvard University Press.  In it, the authors express great concern for the state of the teaching profession in the USA because their analyses revealed that academically talented college graduates tended to avoid teaching as a career and, even among those who entered the profession, the most talented quit early, especially in the scientific fields.  They argued that current teacher licensing and certification policies stifled innovation and disincentivized entry into teaching at the outset.  However, they also argued that, with appropriate incentives, these trends could be ameliorated and possibly reversed.  In addition to improved salaries, the authors supported the widening of alternative paths into the teaching profession, improving school-district recruiting strategies and focusing on the teaching skills of candidates for entry into the teaching profession rather than simply on their prior academic success.

In 2003, Willett and his continuing close collaboratorJudith D. Singer, authored their seminal volume entitled Applied Longitudinal Data Analysis: Modeling Change and Event Occurrence.  Applied Longitudinal Data Analysis was published world-wide by Oxford University Press, to excellent reviews and much success.  It received honorable mention from the American Publishers Association for the best mathematics and statistics book of 2003.  Its main thesis was that—to document the importance and impact of education effectively—one needed to analyze systematically collected longitudinal data on the participants in the process, whether they be students, parents, teachers or administrators.  To support their thesis, the authors laid out detailed quantitative methods for succeeding at this effort.  They argued that—in this effort—two important questions must always be asked of participants in the educational enterprise: (a) how do they change over time, (b) when do they experience critical events during the educational process?  Addressing these two questions from empirical data is not necessarily easy nor straightforward.  To rectify this, in the book, the authors provide a detailed presentation of the methods of individual growth modeling and survival analysis, respectively, using research questions and data-examples drawn from the field.  The book has remained highly influential to the present day, and continues to be cited in thousands of applications and projects around the world.

Most recently, Willett and his colleague, Richard J. Murnane, published a book that presents and describes improved methods for making causal inferences from empirical data in social and educational research.  The book is entitled Methods Matter: Improving Causal Inference in Educational and Social Research was published world-wide in 2011 by Oxford University Press  It is dedicated to the proposition that empirical evidence for the success of educational interventions is only credible if it can truly support causal conclusions.  The book is organized around important substantive research questions in education and uses detailed accounts of exemplary research from a wide variety of fields to describe the optimal design of true experiments, to introduce the concept of natural experiments and regression-discontinuity strategies, to describe the rationale and implementation of instrumental-variables estimation and lay out stratification and propensity-score methods for selection-bias correction.

Willett retired from his active teaching and research role at Harvard University in 2013 and lives in Santa Cruz, California.

References

External links 
 Harvard University Faculty Biography 

People from Harrogate
Living people
1947 births
British expatriate academics in the United States
English non-fiction writers
Harvard Graduate School of Education faculty
Stanford University alumni
English male non-fiction writers